A People Uncounted is a 2011 Canadian documentary film directed by Aaron Yeger. It tells the story about the culture and history of the Romani people (commonly known as gypsies) in Europe, with special emphasis on their plight during The Holocaust. The film also warns of the similarities in intolerance between the time of the Porajmos (Romani Holocaust) and the increasing intolerance and abuse of Roma rights in Europe today. It was nominated for a Producers Guild of America award in 2012. The film was featured in the New York Gipsy Festival and is part of Vanderbilt University's Holocaust Lecture Series.

References

External links

2011 documentary films
2011 films
Canadian documentary films
Documentary films about the Holocaust
Romani genocide
Documentary films about Romani people
2010s English-language films
2010s Canadian films